This is a list of city and town halls in Wales. The list is sortable by building age and height and provides a link to the listing description where relevant.

See also 

 List of city and town halls

 
Wales